Lieutenant-Colonel Henry Gilbert Ralph Nevill, 3rd Marquess of Abergavenny DL (2 September 1854 – 10 January 1938), styled Lord Henry Nevill between 1876 and 1927, was a British peer.

Neville was the second son of William Nevill, 1st Marquess of Abergavenny and his wife Caroline Vanden-Bempde-Johnstone, daughter of Sir John Vanden-Bempde-Johnstone, 2nd Baronet. Born in Bramham, West Yorkshire and christened at St. Alban's Church, Frant, he was a lieutenant-colonel in the Territorial Army Reserves, a major in the Sussex Imperial Yeomanry and a deputy lieutenant of Sussex. In 1881 he lived in Chiddingstone, Kent and in 1891 at Thornhill, Hammerwood, East Sussex. He succeeded to the marquessate in October 1927, aged 73, on the death of his brother, who died without issue.

Family
Lord Abergavenny married Violet Streatfeild, daughter of Lieutenant-Colonel Henry Dorrien Streatfeild, on 12 September 1876. They had three children:

Lady Joan Marion Nevill (1877–1952), she married John Pratt, 4th Marquess Camden.
Gilbert Reginald Nevill (1879–1891).
Geoffrey Nevill (b./d. 1879).

After his first wife's death on 25 December 1880 he married Maud Augusta Beckett-Denison, daughter of William Beckett-Denison, on 20 October 1886. They had one child:

Lady Marguerite Helen Nevill (1887–1975)

After his second wife's death on 15 July 1927 he married his first cousin, Mary Frances Nevill, daughter of the Honourable Ralph Pelham Neville and widow of Henry Hardinge, 3rd Viscount Hardinge, on 18 October 1928. This marriage produced no children. Lord Abergavenny died after falling from a horse during a fox hunt. As he died with no male heir, the marquessate passed to his nephew, Major Guy Larnach-Nevill, on his death. The Marchioness of Abergavenny died in October 1954, aged 85.

Lord Abergavenny appears as "Lord Dumborough" in Siegfried Sassoon's autobiographical novel Memoirs of a Fox-Hunting Man.

Notes

References

External links

 

1854 births
1938 deaths
03
Deputy Lieutenants of Sussex
Henry
Sussex Yeomanry officers
Imperial Yeomanry officers
20th-century British landowners
People from Chiddingstone
People from Forest Row